Corus cylindricus is a species of beetle in the family Cerambycidae. It was described by Breuning in 1935.

References

cylindricus
Beetles described in 1935